Lay Me Down may refer to:

Songs
 "Lay Me Down" (Avicii song), 2013
 "Lay Me Down" (The Dirty Heads song), 2010
 "Lay Me Down" (Pixie Lott song), 2014
 "Lay Me Down" (Sam Smith song), 2013
 "Lay Me Down", by David Crosby and Graham Nash from their album Crosby & Nash, 2004
 "Lay Me Down", by Adele Adkins from her album 25
 "Lay Me Down", by Badfinger from their album Head First
 "Lay Me Down", by Michelle Branch from her album Hotel Paper, featured in The Wreckers' album Stand Still, Look Pretty
 "Lay Me Down", by Suzi Quatro from her album Rock Hard
 "Lay Me Down", by Crossfade from their album We All Bleed

Other uses
 "Lay Me Down" (Haven), a 2013 episode of the television series Haven

See also
 "As I Lay Me Down", a 1995 song by Sophie B. Hawkins
 "As I Lay Me Down" (Wiktoria song), a 2017 song by Swedish singer Wiktoria